N. Kittappa was an Indian politician and former Member of the Legislative Assembly of Tamil Nadu. He was elected to the Tamil Nadu legislative assembly from Mayuram constituency as a Dravida Munnetra Kazhagam candidate in the 1967, 1971, 1977, and 1980 elections.

References 

Dravida Munnetra Kazhagam politicians
Members of the Tamil Nadu Legislative Assembly
Year of birth missing
Possibly living people